The Aeolian Tower was an art installation on the South Bank of the River Thames in London, consisting of a  steel tower covered in 1200 wind-powered LEDs. The tower was in place beside the Waterloo Bridge for three days, from November 14–16, 2008. The intent in creating the Aeolian Tower was to prove in a demonstrable and clearly visible to the public fashion how green energy could be used for different purposes such as artistic and design elements.

See also 
 List of towers

References

Towers in London
Former buildings and structures in the London Borough of Southwark
2008 sculptures